Nicolas Martin Hautorp Madsen (born 17 March 2000) is a Danish footballer who plays for K.V.C. Westerlo.

Youth career
Madsen started playing football at the age of three in local club BK Marienlyst and later joined Næsby BK. In November 2014 it was confirmed that Madsen, who already earlier had been on trials at FC Midtjylland and also Brøndby IF, would join Midtjylland from the summer 2015. On his 15th birthday, he signed a 3-year youth contract with the club. In 2017, he extended his contract until the summer 2019.

Club career

FC Midtjylland
On 28 November 2018, 18-year old Madsen got his official debut for FC Midtjylland. Madsen started on the bench, but replaced Mayron George with 14 minutes left against Dalum IF in the Danish Cup. In September 2019, he got his Danish Superliga debut against Lyngby Boldklub.

On 31 August 2021, Madsen was loaned out to Eredivisie club SC Heerenveen for the 2021-22 season.

Westerlo
After returning to Midtjylland from his loan spell, Madsen was sold to Belgian football; K.V.C. Westerlo confirmed on 20 July 2022, that Madsen had signed a deal until June 2026.

References

External links
Nicolas Madsen at FCM's website

Living people
2000 births
Danish men's footballers
Association football midfielders
Denmark youth international footballers
Denmark under-21 international footballers
BK Marienlyst players
Næsby Boldklub players
FC Midtjylland players
SC Heerenveen players
K.V.C. Westerlo players
Danish Superliga players
Eredivisie players
Danish expatriate men's footballers
Expatriate footballers in the Netherlands
Expatriate footballers in Belgium
Danish expatriate sportspeople in the Netherlands
Danish expatriate sportspeople in Belgium
Footballers from Odense